Food Safety Agency of the Republic of Azerbaijan is a state institution under the responsibility of the Cabinet of Ministers of the Republic of Azerbaijan established to ensure regulation of food security. Goshgar Tahmazli was appointed to the post of the chairman of the agency by the presidential decree dated December 25, 2017.

Events 
The President signed a decree on establishment of Agency on November 14, 2017, which is the central body of executive authority.

A Memorandum of Understanding has been signed between the Food Security Agency of Azerbaijan and the Baku Media Center on March 14, 2018. According to the Memorandum of Understanding, they agreed to develop and strengthen mutual co-operation relationships, to establish and manage public relations, as well as to organize various joint activities for contribution to the Corporate Social Responsibility. The logo of the Agency was presented to the public at the event.

The Memorandum of Understanding has been signed between Anti-Corruption General Directorate with the Prosecutor General and Food Security Agency in the field of fight against corruption on May 2, 2018.

An event dedicated to the 95th anniversary of Heydar Aliyev was held at the Food Safety Agency of the Republic of Azerbaijan on May 7, 2018.

A press conference on the opening of  24th Azerbaijan International Food Industry Exhibition, WorldFood Azerbaijan 2018 and the 12th Azerbaijan International Agriculture Exhibition, Caspian Agro 2018 was held on May 15.

Duties of the Agency 
According to direction of activity determined by this Regulation, responsibilities of agency are as follows:

 to analyze the current situation in the relevant area, to prepare and submit proposals on improving the state regulation and supervision system;
 to fulfill the duties arising from the regulatory activity in the relevant field;
 to ensure the implementation of international agreements to which the Republic of Azerbaijan is a party;
 to identify priorities on the development of the relevant field, together with the relevant state authorities, to ensure the preparation and implementation of state programs and development concepts;
 to carry out a risk analysis as well as risk assessment, risk management, and risk information in the relevant area;
 to register food products for food safety in the country, to provide with certificates of food safety, veterinary and phytosanitary;
 to participate in the preparation of rational physiological norms together with relevant state authorities;
 to take measures in order to ensure consumers with full, accurate and new information on requirements for food safety 
 to make suggestions on the development of the laboratory system for the testing of food products together with relevant state authorities;
 to take measures on the development of entrepreneurship in the relevant field and the implementation of the state regulation on government support for entrepreneurship together with relevant state authorities;
 to protect the population from diseases which are common to humans and animals in a manner determined by law;
 to prepare and approve an anti-epizootic plan;
 to take measures on implementation of the obligations and rules in accordance with the requirements of the World Organisation for Animal Health (WHO) and other international organizations in international trade;
 to provide accounting and reporting in the veterinary field, as well as statistical recording of quarantine diseases in animals;
 to investigate phytosanitary situation in the country and to carry out measures for plant protection;
 to ensure human rights and freedoms related to their activities, to prevent their violation;
 to ensure informing the state about its activities, the creation of official website, sharing of state information defined by law on that site and constantly update this information. 
 to take measures to improve the structure of the Agency;
 to fulfill other duties defined by acts of the President of the Republic.

International relations 
The Agency cooperates with several international organizations:

 World Health Organization
 The Food and Agriculture Organization of the United Nations
 World Organization for Animal Health
 International Plant Protection Convention
 International Organization for Standardization
 International Laboratory Accreditation Cooperation
 Codex Alimentarius Commission
 European Union

See also 
State Agency on Alternative and Renewable Energy Sources (Azerbaijan)
State Procurement Agency (Azerbaijan)
Copyright Agency (Azerbaijan)
State Civil Aviation Administration (Azerbaijan)
Food industry in Azerbaijan

References

External links 
 Official website of the Food Safety Agency of The Republic of Azerbaijan

Regulation in Azerbaijan
Food safety organizations